Aroha Island is a small island near Rangitane, which is about  by road from Kerikeri in the Kerikeri Inlet, Bay of Islands, Northland, New Zealand. The island covers an area of 12 ha. It is owned and managed by the Queen Elizabeth II National Trust and is a major habitat for the North Island brown kiwi. It is linked to the mainland via a causeway.

See also

 List of islands of New Zealand
 List of islands
 Desert island

References

External links
 Aroha Island Ecological Centre

Uninhabited islands of New Zealand
Far North District
Islands of the Bay of Islands